Signing may refer to:

 Using sign language
 Signature, placing one's name on a document
 Signature (disambiguation)
 Manual communication, signing as a form of communication using the hands in place of the voice
 Digital signature, signing as a method of authenticating digital information

See also

 Wikipedia:Sign your posts on talk pages, the Wikipedia policy of signing Talk pages